John Woods (February 20, 1876 – June 15, 1957) was a Canadian politician. He served in the Legislative Assembly of New Brunswick as member of the Progressive Conservative party from 1944 to 1952.

References

1876 births
1957 deaths
Progressive Conservative Party of New Brunswick MLAs